This is a list of schools in Devon, England.

State-funded schools

Primary schools

Abbotskerswell Primary School, Abbotskerswell
All Saints CE Primary School, Smallridge
All Saint Marsh CE Academy, Newton Abbot
Alphington Primary School, Alphington
Appledore School, Appledore
Ashburton Primary School, Ashburton
Ashleigh CE Primary School, Barnstaple
Ashwater Primary School, Ashwater
Avanti Hall School, Exeter
Aveton Gifford CE Primary School, Aveton Gifford
Awliscombe CE Primary School, Awliscombe
Axminster Community Primary Academy, Axminster
Bampton CE Primary School, Bampton
Bassetts Farm Primary School, Exmouth
The Beacon CE Primary School, Exmouth
Beaford Community Primary School, Beaford
Bearnes Primary School, Newton Abbot
Beer CE Primary School, Beer
Bere Alston Primary Academy, Bere Alston
Berry Pomeroy Parochial CE Primary School, Berry Pomeroy
Berrynarbor CE Primary School, Berrynarbor
Bickleigh Down CE Primary School, Woolwell
Bickleigh on Exe CE Primary School, Bickleigh
Bishop's Nympton Primary School, Bishop's Nympton
Bishop's Tawton Primary School, Bishop's Tawton
Bishopsteignton School, Bishopsteignton
Black Torrington CE Primary School, Black Torrington
Blackawton Primary School, Blackawton
Blackpool CE School, Ilsington
Boasley Cross Community Primary School, Boasley Cross
Bolham Community Primary School, Bolham
Bovey Tracey Primary School, Bovey Tracey
Bow Community Primary School, Bow
Bowhill Primary School, St Thomas
Bradford Primary School, Bradford
Bradley Barton Primary School, Newton Abbot
Bradworthy Primary Academy, Bradworthy
Brampford Speke CE Primary School, Brampford Speke
Branscombe CE Primary School, Branscombe
Bratton Fleming Community Primary School, Bratton Fleming
Brayford Academy, Brayford
Bridestowe Primary School, Bridestowe
Bridgerule CE Primary School, Bridgerule
Brixington Primary Academy, Exmouth
Broadclyst Community Primary School, Broadclyst
Broadhembury CE Primary School, Broadhembury
Broadhempston Village Primary School, Broadhempston
Buckfastleigh Primary School, Buckfastleigh
Buckland Brewer Primary School, Buckland Brewer
Burlescombe CE Primary School, Burlescombe
Caen Community Primary School, Braunton
Canada Hill Community Primary School, East Ogwell
Castle Primary School, Tiverton
Chagford CE Primary School, Chagford
Charleton CE Academy, West Charleton
Cheriton Bishop Community Primary School, Cheriton Bishop
Cheriton Fitzpaine Primary School, Cheriton Fitzpaine
Christow Primary School, Christow
Chudleigh CE Community Primary School, Chudleigh
Chudleigh Knighton CE Primary School, Chudleigh Knighton
Chulmleigh Primary School, Chulmleigh
Clawton Primary School, Clawton
The Clinton CE Primary School, Merton
Clyst Heath Community Primary School, Clyst Heath
Clyst Hydon Primary School, Clyst Hydon
Clyst St Mary Primary School, Clyst St Mary
Cockwood Primary School, Cockwood
Colyton Primary Academy, Colyton
Combe Martin Primary School, Combe Martin
Copplestone Primary School, Copplestone
Cornwood CE Primary School, Cornwood
Countess Wear Community School, Countess Wear
Cranbrook Education Campus, Cranbrook
Culmstock Primary School, Culmstock
Dartington CE Academy, Dartington
Dartmouth Academy, Dartmouth
Decoy Primary School, Newton Abbot
Denbury Primary School, Denbury
Diptford Parochial CE Primary School, Diptford
Doddiscombsleigh Primary School, Doddiscombsleigh
Dolton CE Primary School, Dolton
Drake's CE Primary School, East Budleigh
The Duchy School, Bradninch
Dunsford Community Academy, Dunsford
East Allington Primary School, East Allington
East Anstey Primary School, East Anstey
East Worlington Primary School, East Worlington
East-the-Water Community Primary School, Bideford
Eden Park Academy, Barnstaple
The Erme Primary School, Ivybridge
Ermington Primary School, Ermington
Exbourne CE Primary School, Exbourne
Exeter Road Community Primary School, Exmouth
Exminster Community Primary School, Exminster
Exwick Heights Primary School, Exwick
Farway CE Primary School, Farway
Feniton CE Primary school, Feniton
Filleigh Community Primary School, Filleigh
Fremington Primary School, Fremington
Gatehouse Primary Academy, Dawlish
Georgeham CE Primary School, Georgeham
Goodleigh CE Primary School, Goodleigh
Great Torrington Bluecoat CE Primary School, Great Torrington
The Grove School, Totnes
Gulworthy Primary School, Gulworthy
Halberton Primary School, Halberton
Halwill Community Primary School, Halwill
Harbertonford CE Primary School, Harbertonford
Hartland Primary School, Hartland
Hatherleigh Community Primary School, Hatherleigh
Hawkchurch CE School, Hawkchurch
Haytor View Community Primary School, Newton Abbot
Hayward's Primary School, Crediton
Hazeldown Primary School, Teignmouth
Heathcoat Primary School, Tiverton
Hemyock Primary School, Hemyock
Hennock Community Primary School, Hennock
High Bickington CE Primary Academy, High Bickington
Highampton Community Primary School, Highampton
Highweek Community Primary School, Newton Abbot
Holbeton Primary School, Holbeton
Holsworthy CE Primary School, Holsworthy
Holywell CE School, Tawstock
Honiton Primary School, Honiton
Horrabridge Primary School, Horrabridge
Horwood and Newton Tracey Community Primary School, Horwood
Ide Primary School, Ide
Ilfracombe CE Junior School, Ilfracombe
Ilfracombe Infant School, Ilfracombe
Ilsington CE Primary School, Ilsington
Instow Community Primary School, Instow
Ipplepen Primary School, Ipplepen
Kenn CE Primary School, Kennford
Kentisbeare CE Primary School, Kentisbeare
Kentisbury Primary School, Kentisbury
Kenton Primary School, Kenton
Kilmington Primary School, Kilmington
Kings Nympton Community Primary School, King's Nympton
Kingsacre Primary School, Braunton
Kingsbridge Community Primary School, Kingsbridge
Kingskerswell CE Primary School, Kingskerswell
Kingsteignton School, Kingsteignton
Kingswear Community Primary School, Kingswear
Lady Modiford's CE Primary School, Walkhampton
Lady Seaward's CE Primary School, Clyst St George
Ladysmith Infant School, Exeter
Ladysmith Junior School, Exeter
Lamerton CE Primary School, Lamerton
Landkey Community Primary Academy, Landkey
Landscore Primary School, Crediton
Landscove CE Primary School, Landscove
Langtree Community School, Langtree
Lapford Community Primary School, Lapford
Lew Trenchard CE Primary School, Lewdown
Lifton Community Academy, Lifton
Littleham CE Primary School, Littleham
Littletown Primary Academy, Honiton
Loddiswell Primary School, Loddiswell
Lydford Primary School, Lydford
Lympstone CE Primary School, Lympstone
Lynton CE Primary School, Lynton
Malborough with South Huish CE Primary School, Malborough
Manor Primary School, Ivybridge
Marldon CE Primary School, Marldon
Marpool Primary School, Exmouth
Marwood School, Marwood
Mary Tavy and Brentor Community Primary School, Mary Tavy
Meavy CE Primary School, Meavy
Membury Primary Academy, Membury
Milton Abbot School, Milton Abbot
Modbury Primary School, Modbury
Monkerton Community Primary School, Monkerton
Monkleigh Primary School, Monkleigh
Montgomery Primary School, St Thomas
Morchard Bishop CE Primary School, Morchard Bishop
Moretonhampstead Primary School, Moretonhampstead
Mrs Ethelston's CE Primary Academy, Uplyme
Musbury Primary School, Musbury
Newport Community School Primary Academy, Newport
Newton Ferrers CE Primary School, Newton Ferrers
Newton Poppleford Primary School, Newton Poppleford
Newton St Cyres Primary School, Newton St Cyres
Newtown Primary School, Exeter
North Molton Primary School, North Molton
North Tawton Community Primary School, North Tawton
Northlew and Ashbury Parochial CE Primary School, Northlew
Offwell CE Primary School, Offwell
Okehampton Primary School, Okehampton
Orchard Vale Community School, Barnstaple
Otterton CE Primary School, Otterton
Ottery St Mary Primary School, Ottery St Mary
Our Lady and St Patrick's RC Primary School, Teignmouth
Our Lady's RC Primary School, Barnstaple
Parkham Primary School, Parkham
Parracombe CE Primary School, Parracombe
Payhembury CE Primary School, Payhembury
Pilton Bluecoat CE Academy, Pilton
Pilton Infants' School, Pilton
Pinhoe CE Primary School, Pinhoe
Plymtree CE Primary School, Plymtree
Princetown Community Primary School, Princetown
Rackenford CE Primary School, Rackenford
Redhills Primary School, Redhills
Rockbeare CE Primary School, Rockbeare
Roundswell Community Primary Academy, Roundswell
Rydon Primary School, Kingsteignton
St Andrew's CE Primary Academy, Chardstock
St Andrew's CE Primary School, Buckland Monachorum
St Andrew's Primary School, Cullompton
St Catherine's CE Primary School, Heathfield
St David's CE Primary School, Exeter
St George's CE Infant School, Northam
St Giles-on-the-Heath Community School, St Giles on the Heath
St Helen's CE School, Bideford
St James CE Primary School, Okehampton
St John the Baptist RC Primary School, Dartmouth
St John's RC Primary School, Tiverton
St Joseph's RC Primary School, Exmouth
St Joseph's RC Primary School, Highweek
St Leonard's CE Primary School, Exeter
St Margaret's CE Junior School, Northam
St Martin's CE Primary School, Cranbrook
St Mary's CE Primary School, Bideford
St Mary's CE Primary School, Brixton
St Mary's RC Primary School, Axminster
St Mary's RC Primary School, Buckfast
St Michael's CE Primary Academy, Heavitree
St Michael's CE Primary School, Kingsteignton
St Nicholas RC Primary School, Exeter
St Peter's CE Junior School, Tavistock
St Peter's CE Primary School, Budleigh Salterton
St Rumon's CE Infants School, Tavistock
St Sidwell's CE Primary School, Exeter
St Thomas Primary School, Exeter
Salcombe CE Primary School, Salcombe
Sampford Peverell CE Primary School, Sampford Peverell
Sandford School, Sandford
Seaton Primary School, Seaton
Shaldon Primary School, Shaldon
Shaugh Prior Primary School, Shaugh Prior
Shebbear Community School, Shebbear
Sherford Vale School, Sherford
Shirwell Community Primary School, Shirwell
Shute Community Primary School, Shute
Sidbury CE Primary School, Sidbury
Sidmouth CE Primary School, Sidmouth
Silverton CE Primary School, Silverton
South Brent Primary School, South Brent
South Molton Community Primary School, South Molton
South Molton United CE Primary School, South Molton
South Tawton Primary School, South Zeal
Southmead School, Braunton
Sparkwell All Saints Primary School, Sparkwell
Spreyton School, Spreyton
Starcross Primary School, Exeter
Sticklepath Community Primary Academy, Barnstaple
Stockland CE Primary Academy, Stockland
Stoke Canon CE Primary School, Stoke Canon
Stoke Fleming Community Primary School, Stoke Fleming
Stoke Gabriel Primary School, Stoke Gabriel
Stoke Hill Infant School, Exeter
Stoke Hill Junior School, Exeter
Stokeinteignhead School, Stokeinteignhead
Stokenham Area Primary School, Stokenham
Stowford School, Ivybridge
Swimbridge CE Primary School, Swimbridge
Tavistock Primary School, Tavistock
Tedburn St Mary School, Tedburn St Mary
Teignmouth Community School, Teignmouth
Thorverton CE Primary School, Thorverton
Thurlestone All Saints CE Academy, Thurlestone
Tidcombe Primary School, Tiverton
Tipton St John CE Primary School, Tipton St John
The Topsham School, Topsham
Totnes St John's CE Primary School, Totnes
Trinity CE Primary School, Exeter
Two Moors Primary School, Tiverton
Uffculme Primary School, Uffculme
Ugborough Primary School, Ugborough
Umberleigh Primary Academy, Umberleigh
Uplowman CE Primary School, Uplowman
Upottery Primary School, Upottery
Webber's CE Primary School, Holcombe Rogus
Wembury Primary School, Wembury
West Alvington CE Academy, West Alvington
West Croft School, Bideford
West Down School, West Down
West Hill Primary School, West Hill
Westcliff Primary Academy, Dawlish
Westclyst Community Primary School, Westclyst
Whimple Primary School, Whimple
Whipton Barton Infants School, Whipton
Whipton Barton Junior School, Whipton
Whitchurch Community Primary School, Whitchurch
Widecombe-in-the-Moor Primary, Widecombe in the Moor
Wilcombe Primary School, Tiverton
Willand School, Willand
Willowbank Primary School, Cullompton
Willowbrook School, Beacon Heath
Winkleigh Primary School, Winkleigh
Witheridge CE Primary Academy, Witheridge
Withycombe Raleigh CE Primary School, Exmouth
Wolborough CE Primary School, Wolborough
Woodbury CE Primary School, Woodbury
Woodbury Salterton CE Primary School, Woodbury Salterton
Woodlands Park Primary School, Ivybridge
Woodwater Academy, Exeter
Woolacombe School Woolacombe
Woolsery Primary School, Woolsery
Wynstream School, Exeter
Yeo Valley Primary School, Barnstaple
Yeoford Community Primary School, Yeoford

Non-selective secondary schools

Atlantic Academy, Bideford
Atrium Studio School, Ashburton
Avanti Hall School, Exeter
Axe Valley Academy, Axminster
Bideford College, Bideford
Braunton Academy, Braunton
Chulmleigh College, Chulmleigh
Clyst Vale Community College, Broadclyst
Coombeshead Academy, Newton Abbot
Cranbrook Education Campus, Cranbrook
Cullompton Community College, Cullompton
Dartmouth Academy, Dartmouth
Dawlish College, Dawlish
Exmouth Community College, Exmouth
Great Torrington School, Great Torrington
Holsworthy Community College, Holsworthy
Honiton Community College, Honiton
The Ilfracombe Academy, Ilfracombe
Isca Academy, Exeter
Ivybridge Community College, Ivybridge
King Edward VI Community College, Totnes
The King's School, Ottery St Mary
Kingsbridge Community College, Kingsbridge
Newton Abbot College, Newton Abbot
Okehampton College, Okehampton
The Park Community School, Barnstaple
Pilton Community College, Pilton
Queen Elizabeth's School, Crediton
St James School, Exeter
St Luke's Church of England School, Exeter
St Peter's Church of England Aided School, Heavitree
Sidmouth College, Sidmouth
South Dartmoor Community College, Ashburton
South Devon UTC, Newton Abbot
South Molton Community College, South Molton
Tavistock College, Tavistock
Teign School, Kingsteignton
Teignmouth Community School, Teignmouth
Tiverton High School, Tiverton
Uffculme School, Uffculme
West Exe School, Exeter

Grammar schools
Colyton Grammar School, Colyford

Special and alternative schools

ACE Tiverton Special School, Tiverton
Barley Lane School, St Thomas
Bidwell Brook School, Dartington
Devon Hospitals' Short Stay School, Exeter
Ellen Tinkham School, Pinhoe
Glendinning Academy, Newton Abbot
The Lampard Community School, Barnstaple
Marland School, Peters Marland
Mill Water School, Bicton
Orchard Manor School, Dawlish
Pathfield School, Pilton
The Promise School, Okehampton
River Dart Academy, Dartington
The Shoreline Academy, Roundswell
Southbrook School, Exeter
Stansfield Academy, Exeter
Torlands Academy, St Thomas

Further education
Academy of Music and Sound, Exeter
Bicton College, Budleigh Salterton
Exeter College, Exeter
Exeter Mathematics School, Exeter
Oakwood Court College, Dawlish
Petroc, Barnstaple/Tiverton
South Devon College, Newton Abbot

Independent schools

Primary and preparatory schools
Exeter Cathedral School, Exeter
The New School, Exminster
Park School, Dartington
St Christopher's School, Staverton
St Peter's Preparatory School, Lympstone

Senior and all-through schools

Blundell's School, Tiverton
Colours Academy, Ivybridge
Exeter School, Exeter
Kingsley School, Bideford
The Maynard School, Exeter
Mount Kelly School, Tavistock
St John's School, Sidmouth
St Wilfrid's School, Exeter
Sands School, Ashburton
Shebbear College, Shebbear
South Devon Steiner School, Dartington
Stover School, Teigngrace
Totnes Progressive School, Totnes
Trinity School, Teignmouth
West Buckland School, West Buckland

Special and alternative schools

Acorn School, Winkleigh
Belong School Devon, Exeter
Cambian Devon School, Paignton
Chances Educational Support Services, Dawlish
The Copper Academy, Holsworthy
Exeter Royal Academy for Deaf Education, Exmouth
The Greater Horseshoe School, Heathfield
Highgate Hill House School, Holsworthy
Infocus School, Countess Wear
K-HQ, Dulford
The Libra School, South Radworthy
Magdalen Court School, Exeter
On Track Education, Barnstaple
On Track Education, Dartington
On Track Education, Totnes
The Outdoors School, Shillingford Abbot
Quay View School, Bere Alston
Running Deer School, Moretonhampstead
School for Inspiring Talents, Newton Abbot
Tor View School, Tavistock
Vranch House School, Exeter
The Wildings, Talaton

Devon
Schools
Schools in Devon